The Toyota UZ engine family is a gasoline fueled 32-valve quad-camshaft V8 piston engine series used in Toyota's luxury offerings and sport utility vehicles. Three variants have been produced: the 1UZ-FE, 2UZ-FE, and 3UZ-FE. Production spanned 24 years, from 1989 to mid 2013, ending with the final production of the 3UZ-FE-powered Toyota Crown Majesta I-FOUR. Toyota's UZ engine family was replaced by the UR engine family.

1UZ-FE
The  all-alloy 1UZ-FE debuted in 1989 in the first generation Lexus LS 400/Toyota Celsior and the engine was progressively released across a number of other models in the Toyota/Lexus range. It has proven to be a strong, reliable and smooth powerplant with features such as 6-bolt main bearings and belt-driven quad-camshafts. The water pump is also driven by the timing/cam belt. The connecting rods and crankshaft are constructed of steel. The pistons are hypereutectic.

The FV2400-2TC derivative is one of the few road-going engines that is FAA approved for use in an airplane.

Its resemblance to a race engine platform (6 bolt cross mains and over square configuration) was confirmed in 2007 by David Currier (in an interview with v-eight.com), vice president of TRD USA, stating that the 1UZ platform was based on CART/IRL engine design. It was planned to be used on GT500 vehicles, however its subsequent use in the Daytona Prototype use had not been planned.

The 1UZ-FE was voted to the Ward's 10 Best Engines list for 1998 through 2000.

Applications (calendar years):
 1989–2000 Lexus LS 400/Toyota Celsior
 1989–2002 Toyota Crown/Toyota Crown Majesta
 1989–2004 Toyota HiAce HiMedic Ambulance (Japan only)
 1991–2000 Lexus SC 400/Toyota Soarer
 1992–1997 Toyota Aristo
 1997–2000 Lexus GS 400
 1995–1997 SARD MC8/MC8-R

2UZ-FE

The 2UZ-FE was a  version built in Tahara, Aichi, Japan and at Toyota Motor Manufacturing Alabama. Unlike its other UZ counterparts, this version uses a cast iron block to increase durability, as it was designed for low-revving, high-torque pickup and SUV applications.

Like the 1UZ-FE, it has aluminum DOHC cylinder heads, multi-port fuel injection, 4 valves per cylinder with bucket tappets, one-piece cast camshafts, and a cast aluminum intake manifold. For 2010, it was replaced by the 1UR-FE or 3UR-FE, depending on the country.

Applications (calendar years):
 2002–2004 Lexus GX 470
 1998–2005 Lexus LX 470
 1998–2005 Toyota Land Cruiser
 2002–2004 Toyota 4Runner
 1999–2004 Toyota Tundra
 2000–2004 Toyota Sequoia

Toyota Racing Development offered a bolt-on supercharger kit for the 2000–2003 Tundra/Sequoia and the 1998–2003 LX 470.

Another 2UZ-FE variation adds VVT-i, electronic throttle control, and a plastic intake manifold.

Applications (calendar years):
 2004–2009 Lexus GX 470
 2005–2007  Lexus LX 470
 2005–2009 Toyota 4Runner
 2005–2011 Toyota Land Cruiser
 2005–2009 Toyota Tundra
 2004–2009 Toyota Sequoia
 2007–2012 Lexus LX 470 (Hong Kong only)

3UZ-FE

The 3UZ-FE is a  version built in Japan. Bore and stroke is 
. The engine block and heads are aluminum. It has a DOHC valvetrain with 4 valves per cylinder and VVT-i. It uses SEFI fuel injection. In 2003, the engine was paired with a six-speed automatic transmission, resulting in improved fuel economy over the previous five-speed automatic.

A 4.5L version replaced the 3S-GTE as the engine used in Toyota's  Super GT race cars up to 2009 and a 5.0L version was used in the Grand American Road Racing (Grand Am) Series.

Applications (calendar years):
 Lexus LS 430 (2000–2006)
 Lexus GS 430 (2000–2007)
 Lexus SC 430/Toyota Soarer (2001–2010)
 Toyota Crown Majesta (2004–2013)
 Hongqi HQ430 (2006–2010)
 Super GT
 GT500 Race Car
 Lexus SC 430 GT500 Race Car (2006–2008)

Derivatives

FV2400-2TC
In 1997, the US Federal Aviation Administration granted production certification for the FV2400-2TC, a twin-turbocharged airplane powerplant based on the 1UZ-FE. The  FV2400 was developed in partnership with Hamilton Standard, which provided the digital engine-control system. The goal was to produce a four-seat propeller aircraft.

VT300i
In 1998, a marine derivative of the UZ powerplant was produced for boating applications.

Applications (calendar years):
1998 Toyota Epic S21
 1999–2001 Toyota Epic S22/SX22
 1999–2001 Toyota Epic X22

References

See also

 List of Toyota engines

UZ
V8 engines
Gasoline engines by model